is a 2011 pink film musical about a woman and a sea creature. It is a co-production between Germany's Rapid Eye Movies and Japan's Kokuei Company. It was directed by Shinji Imaoka (who had earlier directed the pink films Lunch Box and Frog Song), shot by cinematographer Christopher Doyle  and includes music by German band Stereo Total. Underwater Love was shot in 5 ½ days, one take only.

Plot
Asuka, a woman in her thirties, works in a lakeside fish factory. She's about to be married to her boss, Taki. But one day, she encounters a kappa – a water sprite found in Japanese folklore – and learns that the creature is in fact the reborn form of Aoki, an old crush who'd drowned to death when they were 17.

Cast
 Sawa Masaki as Asuka Kawaguchi
 Yoshiro Umezawa as Tetsuya Aoki
 Ai Narita as Reiko Shima
 Mutsuo Yoshioka as Hajime Taki
 Fumio Moriya
 Hiroshi Satō

External links
 
 
 Review at BeyondHollywood.com

2011 films
German pornographic films
Films directed by Shinji Imaoka
Pink films
2010s pornographic films
Japanese pornographic films
2010s Japanese-language films
2010s Japanese films
2010s German films